Tracy Lynn Middendorf (born January 26, 1970) is an American television, movie, and stage actress. Middendorf's most notable roles were in the horror film Wes Craven's New Nightmare, the MTV series Scream, and the HBO series Boardwalk Empire. She also appeared in the Broadway production of Ah, Wilderness!. She has won two Ovation Awards, one Drama-Logue Award, and one Los Angeles Drama Critics Circle Award for her stage work, and also received an American Movie Award in 2015.

Biography

Acting career
Middendorf was born in Miami Beach, Florida. She attended the Conservatory of Theatrical Arts at SUNY Purchase before breaking into television as Carrie Brady on the daytime soap opera Days of Our Lives in 1992. The following year, she made her feature-film debut in the critically acclaimed Wes Craven's New Nightmare, wherein she played the supporting role of Julie.

During the 1990s, Middendorf built her career as a supporting actress in several television movies and episodes of series, including Beverly Hills, 90210 (the recurring role of Laura Kingman during the show's fourth season), Murder, She Wrote, Star Trek: Deep Space Nine, The X-Files, Angel, Ally McBeal, Chicago Hope, and Millennium. She also starred in the television movie Dying to Belong, and had a small part in For Love of the Game.
In March 1995, she resumed her stage career in Los Angeles playing Nicole Warren Diver in F. Scott Fitzgerald's Tender is the Night directed by Simon Levy at the Fountain Theatre. The same year she played Jill in Pilgrims by Stephen Metcalfe at the Old Globe Theatre in San Diego.
The following year, she got an Ovation Awards nomination for her performance in Tennessee Williams's Orpheus Descending. In 1998, she briefly relocated to the East Coast to star in two different plays: Ah, Wilderness! at the Lincoln Center's Vivian Beaumont Theater (that marked her Broadway debut) and the Big Knife in Massachusetts. She returned to the Los Angeles stage with Tennessee Williams's Summer and Smoke, winning the Ovation Award for the best leading female performance.

During the 2000s, Middendorf had guest-starring stints in Six Feet Under, CSI: Crime Scene Investigation, and Cold Case, among other shows, and had recurring roles in 24, The Division, Alias, and Lost.

On the big screen, she had parts in Mission: Impossible 3, The Assassination of Richard Nixon, El Cortez, and Just Add Water.
In 2002, she won another Ovation Award for her performance in Stephen Sachs' After the Fall, which ran for 7 sold-out months at the Fountain Theatre. For that production, she also won the Los Angeles Drama Critics Circle Award.

In 2010, Middendorf was cast as Babette in Boardwalk Empire, first appearing in the series pilot and featured in other eight episodes through the first and the second seasons. After starring in Reaching for the Moon,  she won a recurring role in the action-drama hit show The Last Ship as Darien Chandler.

Middendorf continued her stage work, including the title role in Miss Julie, a  Yale Repertory Theatre  production of Battle of Black and Dogs, a Shakespeare Theatre Company production of Old Times, and debuted as a director in Louise Rozett's Break during the New York International Fringe Festival in August 2011.

In April 2015, she won an American Movie Award as Best Actress for her performance in Snowflake, a critically acclaimed short film she filmed in New York City opposite Ele Keats
After starring in the Beth Henley's play Abundance at the Actors Company Theatre in New York City, Middendorf joined the cast of the MTV series Scream as Maggie Duval.

Personal life
Middendorf is married to writer Franz Wisner (Honeymoon with My Brother), and they have a son Oscar.  Eldest son, Calvin, is from a previous relationship with actor Cameron Dye.

Philanthropy
In 2012, Middendorf created Shutter To Think, a project designed to use photography as a way to support programs for girls around the world. Through the sale of personal photographs taken by well-known actors, writers, directors, and musicians, Shutter to Think is able to help fund programs with globally recognized organizations that are focused on providing opportunities to girls. Contributors include Steve Buscemi, Meryl Streep, and Nicholas D. Kristof, among others.

Filmography

Film

Television

Theatre

References

External links
Tracy Middendorf at showmag.com

1970 births
American film actresses
American people of German descent
American soap opera actresses
American television actresses
Living people
People from Miami Beach, Florida
State University of New York at Purchase alumni
Philanthropists from New York (state)
People from Jasper, Georgia
20th-century American actresses
21st-century American actresses